RRU may refer to:

 Rapid response unit, a specialized medical response team
 Rashtriya Raksha University, National security and Police university of India
 Remote radio unit, part of a wireless network 
 Ridge Racer Unbounded, a racing video game from Microsoft
 Royal Roads University, a Canadian public university